The Batu Pahat District is a district in the state of Johor, Malaysia. It lies southeast of Muar, southwest of Kluang, northwest of Pontian, south of Segamat and Tangkak District. The capital of the district is Bandar Penggaram.

Geography 

It is 239 km (150 miles) from Kuala Lumpur. The next nearest town is Muar which is 50 km (30 miles) northwest of Batu Pahat. The town of Kluang is located about 52 km (32 miles) to the northeast.
Johor Bahru is located about 70 km to 100 km (43 miles to 62 miles) to the southeast of the town.

The district itself borders the districts of Segamat to the north, Kluang to the east, Muar to the west and shares a border in the southeast with the district of Pontian. The coast of the Straits of Melaka lies to the south.

History 

The town acquired the name Batu Pahat, which means "chiselled stone", from the quarries near the estuary. There are multiple theories as to the origin of this name. In around 1456, the Siamese army, led by Admiral Awi Di Chu, camped in Batu Pahat before attacking Malacca. Legend has it that the invading Siamese troops were chiselling rocks at a rocky spot in the coastal village of Kampung Minyak Beku, in hope to get fresh water during their retreat from the Melaka troops, led by Tun Perak, the famous Bendahara (Prime Minister) of the Malacca Sultanate. Another possible explanation for the origin of the name is the fortress ("A Famosa") built by the Portuguese after capturing Melaka, which was made from granite rocks taken from the mouth of Sungai Batu Pahat.

Renowned for its salted fish in the past, Batu Pahat was formerly known as Bandar Penggaram, which means "town of salt-makers".  In 1893/1894, the present township was founded by Dato' Bentara Luar, Mohamed Salleh bin Perang, acting on the orders of the Sultan of Johor, Sultan Abu Bakar.

Batu Pahat was the location of the headquarters for the Fiji Infantry Regiment, serving as part of the Commonwealth forces during the Malayan Emergency, from 1952 to 1956.  The 1,600 strong force saw considerable action during the campaign and contributed to the securing of the area during that period.

16 October 1980 was marked as one of Batu Pahat's bloodiest day in recent history. At approximately 9:30 AM, 20 Muslim extremists led by Mohd. Nasir Ismail, stormed into the Batu Pahat Police station with machetes, slashing and injuring 23 police staff and civilians. 8 of the extremists were shot dead by the police. The motive of the attack was never fully determined.

Today, the ancient well can still be found in Minyak Beku, though little was done to maintain this ancient landmark which gives name to the town. For the town's centennial celebration in the early '90s, a quaint monument depicting a floating hand chiselling a rock was set up in the town square. It became the landmark of the town instantaneously. Currently, the newly refurbished town square is popular with locals on weekend nights and also provides as a venue for many public festive celebrations.

Bandar Penggaram, Batu Pahat is growing rapidly and has now developed to become the second major town in Johor state after Johor Bahru.

Subdivisions and administration 

The district's 525 gazetted villages (kampung-kampung) and village-clusters (kampung rangkaian) were annexed to their bigger immediate neighbours into mukims for the purpose of administration. The villages are represented by their village heads (ketua-ketua kampung) who answer to the subdistrict chief (Penghulu) administering the mukim. The mukim itself is under the jurisdiction of the Pegawai Daerah or District Officer. The district office of Batu Pahat also has five district engineers (Jurutera Daerah) to oversee all the subdistricts.

The district (daerah) is divided into fourteen mukims, each designated with a number (Mukim 1 to 12, 17, 18):
Lubok (Mukim I) established 1921
Bagan 峇眼 (Mukim II) established 1921
Peserai (Mukim III) established 1921
Simpang Kiri (Mukim IV) established 1925
Simpang Kanan (Mukim V) established 1927
Linau (Mukim VI) established 1935
Tanjung Semberong (Mukim VII) established 1940
Sri Gading (Mukim VIII) established 1942
Minyak Beku 米那务固 (Mukim IX) established 1943
Kampung Bahru (Mukim X) established 1946
Sungai Punggor (Mukim XI) established 1949
Sungai Kluang (Mukim XII) established 1952
Chaah Bahru (Mukim XVII) established 1957
Sri Medan 铁山 (Mukim XVIII) established 1965

Growth in small and medium industries such as textiles, garments and electronics helped to boost development, and Batu Pahat was upgraded to town status (Majlis Perbandaran) in 2001, alongside Muar, Kluang and Skudai.

Local authorities 
Bandar Penggaram, Batu Pahat is administered by Batu Pahat Municipal Council which was upgraded from the previous District Council (Majlis Daerah Batu Pahat Barat) on 9 June 2001 while Yong Peng is administered by Majlis Daerah Yong Peng or Yong Peng District Council which previous named Majlis Daerah Batu Pahat Timur.

 Batu Pahat Municipal Council consists of the following mukim: Sri Gading, Simpang Kanan, Minyak Beku, Kampung Bahru, Sungai Punggor, Sungai Kluang, Linau, Lubok, Bagan and Peserai
 while Yong Peng District Council consists of the following mukim: Tanjung Semberong, Chaah Bahru, Sri Medan, Simpang Kiri

Towns 
 Rengit
 Yong Peng
 Semerah
 Parit Sulong
 Sri Gading
 Parit Raja
 Senggarang
 Tongkang Pechah
 Sri Medan
 Parit Yaani

Demographics  

The district of Batu Pahat has a population of about 398,014 local residents. The population growth in 2000 was 1.55%. The most populated mukim is Simpang Kanan with more than 311,862 people and the least populated is Bagan with a population of only 4,692.

The Malays are the majority (51%), while the Chinese is the largest minority (46%) and the Indian (3%).

The major religions are Islam, Buddhism, Taoism, Confucianism, Christianity and Hinduism.

Batu Pahat has more than four hundred Chinese temples due to the large Chinese population. Some of these temples are more than one century old and many have also become popular tourist attractions. Many devotees and tourists visited these temples and this has become an important part of the local economy. Chong Long Gong Temple (海口石文丁崇龙宫) was founded in 1864, is one of the popular tourist spot for devotees. A Chinese temple located at Bukit Pasir is the Kian Nam Shee Temple (建南寺). The Lim Sz Chong Su Tian Hou Temple (峇株吧辖林氏宗祠天后宫) was established in 1912 and is located in the downtown. There are also Buddhist temples or centres like Bhaddekaratta Hermitage (一夜贤者禅院), Bhavana Buddhist Society and Batu Pahat Insight Meditation Society.

There are two main mosques in Batu Pahat: Masjid Dato' Bentara Luar (located at Jalan Ampuan) and Masjid Sultan Ismail (located at Jalan Kluang)

Federal Parliament and State Assembly Seats 

List of Batu Pahat district representatives in the Federal Parliament (Dewan Rakyat) 

List of Batu Pahat district representatives in the State Legislative Assembly (Dewan Undangan Negeri)

Election results 

Due to electoral division by Election Commission of Malaysia, there are three parliamentary and state constituencies (DUN) dividing Batu Pahat town. There are (P147) Parit Sulong parliamentary seat, (N17) Semerah state seat; (P149) Parliament Sri Gading parliamentary seat, (N21) Parit Yanni state seat and (P150) Batu Pahat parliamentary seat, (N23) Penggaram state seat. (Election Results of the 13th Malaysian General Elections)
The last election results listed as below:

P150 - Batu Pahat parliament seat

N23 - Penggaram state seat   (Cover most of the area of Batu Pahat town)

P149 - Sri Gading parliamentary seat

N21 - Parit Yanni state seat  (Part of the division in Batu Pahat town e.g.: Taman Maju, Taman Flora Utama, Parit Besar, BP Mall)

P147 - Parit Sulong parliamentary seat

N17 - Semerah state seat   (Part of the division in Batu Pahat town e.g.: Taman Pantai, Jalan Syahbandar, Jalan Rugayah)

Economy
The main economy activities in the district are furniture manufacturing, food processing and agritourism.
Main industrial towns in the district are Ayer Hitam, Batu Pahat Town, Pekan Sri Wangi, Parit Sulong and Yong Peng. As of 2010, the per capita income was MYR14,122. Local "pasar malam" or night markets are held in residential areas with petty traders setting up stalls and selling a variety of food and daily necessities at bargain prices.

Shopping and leisure 
 Batu Pahat Mall (Pacific Hypermarket)
SquareOne Mall (Parkson and AEON BiG Hypermarket)
The Summit Parade (Target Supermarket)
Green Point
Econsave Yong Peng
Save n' Save
The Store Batu Pahat (Jalan Rugayah and Jalan Zabedah)
Nirwana Maju Hypermarket (Taman Soga, Tongkang Pechah, Parit Raja)
Lotus's Parit Raja
Batu Pahat Mall
Cowboy Supermarket
Starbucks Drive Thru
BP Old Streets Business Park (Subway, Coffee Beans and Tea Leafs, etc.)
D' Garden Business Park
Rivercity Business Park 
Versis Business Park (under construction)
Burger King Drive Thru
KFC Drive Thru
McDonald's Drive Thru (Taman Flora Utama & Parit Raja)
A&W Restaurant (PETRONAS Jalan Rahmat)
Baskin Robin (PETRONAS Jalan Tan Swee Hoe)
BP Walk (Jalan Rahmat)
Dataran Penggaram
BP Waterfront Park (under construction)
Water Theme Park (Bukit Pasir)
Taman Setia Jaya 2 commercial park
Taman Flora Utama commercial park
Taman Bukit Pasir commercial park
Tasik Y
Taman Botani Johor, Seri Medan

Education 
In Batu Pahat, there are 24 national secondary schools, 3 independent Chinese secondary schools and a vocational school. Among some of the best secondary schools in Batu Pahat are:

Notable people 
 

Mohid Mohamed, Chief Secretary for the Ministry of Youth and Sport

References

External links 

 
 Majlis Perbandaran Batu Pahat
 Ferry Terminal Batu Pahat
 Accommodation
 Batu Pahat Online Portal with maps, news, events and movies
 Batu Pahat Online Directory
 Batu Pahat Online Yellow Pages 峇株吧辖网络黄页
 Batu Pahat Local Web Service